The Sicilian orange salad (Insalata di arance) is a typical salad dish of the Spanish and Sicilian cuisine, which uses oranges as its main ingredient. It is usually served at the beginning or at the end of a meal.

In its most basic form the salad consists of thin, tart orange slices served with olive oil, salt and black pepper. The slightly tart taste of a salad, which is usually achieved by using a vinaigrette is instead provided by the orange slices themselves.

Common variations mix the orange slices with a few additional ingredients such as sliced fennel bulbs, onions and black olives. In such cases often a vinaigrette is added as well, which is made of olive oil, white wine vinegar, salt, pepper and various herbs, e.g. rosemary.

See also
 List of fruit dishes
 List of salads
 List of Sicilian dishes

Notes

Salads
Cuisine of Sicily
Spanish cuisine
Fruit salads
Vegetable dishes
Citrus dishes